Full Circle, also known as Full Circle: Miami in its third season, is an American television series, that follows an anthology format from season to season and ran on the Audience Network. A first season was ordered in April, 2013 and started airing on October 9, 2013. After airing a second season, the series was renewed for a political-themed third season in December, 2015.

Cast

Season 1
David Boreanaz as Jace Cooper
Keke Palmer as Chan'dra Stevens
Kate Walsh as Trisha Campbell
Julian McMahon as Stanley Murphy
Billy Campbell as Trent Campbell
Cheyenne Jackson as Peter Barlow
Noah Silver as Robbie Fontaine
Ally Sheedy as Celeste Fontaine
Tom Felton as Tim Abbott
Minka Kelly as Bridgette Murphy
Robin Weigert as Detective Karen Tanner
Gia Crovatin as Sabrina

Season 2
Terry O’Quinn as Jimmy Parerra
Stacy Keach as Bud O'Rourke
Chris Bauer as Richie DeStefano
Rita Wilson as Shelly Rezko
Brittany Snow as Katie Parerra
Patrick Fugit as Paulie Parerra
David Koechner as Phil Davis
Calista Flockhart as Ellen Kelly-O'Rourke
Eric McCormack as Ken Waltham
Kate Burton as Vera Quinn

Season 3
Christopher Gorham as Rick D'Andres
Dougray Scott as Senator David Faulkner
Graham Beckel as Fredrico Sturgis
Harold Perrineau as Damon Houserman
Laura San Giacomo as Elena Medina
Kim Raver as Madeline Faulkner
Raymond Cruz as Federico Sturgis
Bob Stephenson as Sidney Waverly
Mariana Klaveno as Angela Mancuso
Max Arciniega as Alex Hidell

References

External links

2010s American drama television series
English-language television shows
Serial drama television series